A thicket is a very dense stand of trees or tall shrubs, often dominated by only one or a few species, to the exclusion of all others. They may be formed by species that shed large numbers of highly viable seeds that are able to germinate in the shelter of the maternal plants. 

In some conditions, the formation or spread of thickets may be assisted by human disturbance of an area.

Where a thicket is formed of briar (also spelled brier), which is a common name for any of a number of unrelated thorny plants, it may be called a briar patch.  Plants termed briar include species in the genera Rosa (Rose), Rubus, and Smilax.

References

Habitats
Habitat
Shrubs
Plant common names